Paulo Jorge dos Santos Futre (born 28 February 1966) is a Portuguese former footballer who played mostly as a left winger. He is one of the greatest natural talents of the Portugal.

After starting playing for Sporting, he moved to Porto – winning the 1987 European Cup – after which he embarked in an extensive professional career, having represented clubs in Spain, France, Italy, England and Japan, most notably Atlético Madrid. He also appeared for Benfica during four months in 1993, and his later years were blighted by injury problems.

A Portuguese international since the age of 17, Futre earned over 40 caps for his country, representing it at the 1986 World Cup.

Club career

Sporting / Porto
Born in Montijo, Setúbal District, Futre first appeared professionally in 1983–84, as a 17-year-old for Sporting CP, whose youth system he had joined at the age of nine. When he requested a pay raise from president João Rocha, he was turned down and left for FC Porto after just one season, as veterans Jaime Pacheco and António Sousa moved in the opposite direction as part of the deal.

In the following years, Futre collected two Primeira Liga titles, also helping the northerners to the 1986–87 European Cup, putting on a Man of the match performance in the final against FC Bayern Munich.

Atlético Madrid
After that continental win, Futre was traded to Atlético Madrid in Spain, earning a reported annual salary of €650,000. At the capital club he quickly rose to fan favourite status, but his physical weakness left him with several knee injuries which tormented his career in the 1990s.

In his fifth season, Futre provided countless assists for striker Manolo who scored 27 goals for the Pichichi Trophy, with him netting in the campaign's Copa del Rey, a 2–0 win over neighbours Real Madrid. During most of his spell with the Colchoneros, he was also team captain.

Journeyman / Retirement
In January 1993, Futre moved to Porto and Sporting rivals S.L. Benfica, winning a Taça de Portugal in his short stay (and scoring in the final against Boavista F.C. in a 5–2 triumph), as his injury woes persisted. Afterwards, he signed a one-season contract with Olympique de Marseille, where he teamed up with countryman Rui Barros. His time in France was largely disappointing, however, once again due to continual injuries, as well as competition from Dragan Stojković in his position, which limited him to only two goals in eight league appearances.

Halfway through 1993–94, despite being linked with A.C. Milan, Futre eventually transferred to newly promoted Serie A side A.C. Reggiana 1919. On his debut, on 21 November 1993, he scored a memorable individual goal which opened the scoring in a 2–0 success over U.S. Cremonese and gave the hosts their first ever win in the top flight; during the second half, however, he suffered a serious injury after an aggressive challenge from Alessandro Pedroni, which kept him out for the rest of the season as his team narrowly avoided relegation.

The following campaign, Futre managed only 12 appearances and netted four times, which were not enough to save Reggiana from relegation. For 1995–96 he did move to Milan but, due to continuing injury troubles as well as competition from other talented offensive, creative players in his position, he only featured once for the Fabio Capello-led team, coming on as a substitute for Roberto Baggio in the final match of the season against Cremonese at the San Siro, which ended 7–1 for the hosts who celebrated the league conquest.

After his time in Italy, Futre agreed to a one-year deal with West Ham United, where he infamously refused to play until he was given squad number 10. Finally, he returned to Atlético Madrid (ten La Liga matches in 1997–98), effectively ending his career with J1 League club Yokohama Flügels; he ranked joint-98th in World Soccer's 100 Greatest Players of the 20th Century, published in December 1999.

Futre worked as director of football at Atlético Madrid from 2000 to 2003, subsequently becoming a real-estate developer in his hometown. In May 2011, he was part of Dias Ferreira's team in an unsuccessful run for Sporting's presidency.

International career
Futre played 41 times for Portugal in a 12-year span, scoring six goals. His debut came against Finland for the UEFA Euro 1984 qualifiers, on 27 April 1983 – he was only 17 years and 204 days old, breaking a national team record.

Futre was a member of the national team that competed in the 1986 FIFA World Cup in Mexico, playing 90 minutes in the 1–3 loss to Morocco in an eventual group stage exit.

Style of play
A highly talented and creative left-footed winger whose playing style initially drew comparisons with Diego Maradona, Futre was known in particular for his explosive acceleration as well as his excellent technical ability. His dribbling skills, speed, flair, balance, agility and quick feet enabled him to be extremely fast with the ball at his feet and allowed him to take on several opponents.

Due to his vision and work-rate, Futre was capable both of creating and scoring goals, and was a versatile player who was also deployed as a second striker and as an attacking midfielder on occasion during his time in Italy. Despite the precocious talent he demonstrated in his youth, he was also prone to injuries which greatly affected his career, leading to increasingly inconsistent performances, a poorer goalscoring rate, and a premature retirement at the age of 32.

Personal life
Futre's younger son, Fábio, was also a footballer. A midfielder, he played for Atlético Madrid's youth teams, and was called up for Portugal under-17s. His nephew, Artur Futre, appeared professionally for F.C. Alverca, F.C. Maia and C.D. Aves, without much impact; his older son, Paulo, played in a rock band, "Fr1day".

Paulo Sr. was also a television presenter, hosting the TVI 24 late night talk show A Noite do Futrebol.

Career statistics

Club
Appearances and goals by club, season and competition.

International
National team appearances and goals listed by year.

International goals
Scores and results list Portugal's goal tally first, score column indicates score after each Futre goal.

Honours
Porto
Primeira Liga: 1984–85, 1985–86
Supertaça Cândido de Oliveira: 1984, 1986
European Cup: 1986–87

Atlético Madrid
Copa del Rey: 1990–91, 1991–92

Benfica
Taça de Portugal: 1992–93

Milan
Serie A: 1995–96

Individual
Ballon d'Or: 1987 (2nd place)
UNICEF European Footballer of the Season: 1986–87
Portuguese Footballer of the Year: 1986, 1987
World Soccer: 100 Greatest Footballers of All Time

References

External links

Paulo Futre at Giant Bomb

1966 births
Living people
People from Montijo, Portugal
Portuguese footballers
Association football wingers
Primeira Liga players
Sporting CP footballers
FC Porto players
S.L. Benfica footballers
La Liga players
Atlético Madrid footballers
Ligue 1 players
Olympique de Marseille players
Serie A players
A.C. Reggiana 1919 players
A.C. Milan players
Premier League players
West Ham United F.C. players
J1 League players
Yokohama Flügels players
Portugal youth international footballers
Portugal under-21 international footballers
Portugal international footballers
1986 FIFA World Cup players
Portuguese expatriate footballers
Expatriate footballers in Spain
Expatriate footballers in France
Expatriate footballers in Italy
Expatriate footballers in England
Expatriate footballers in Japan
Portuguese expatriate sportspeople in Spain
Portuguese expatriate sportspeople in France
Portuguese expatriate sportspeople in Italy
Portuguese expatriate sportspeople in England
Portuguese expatriate sportspeople in Japan
Atlético Madrid non-playing staff
Sportspeople from Setúbal District